The Parkway is the name of Interstate 376 in Pennsylvania.

The Parkway may also refer to:
 Memorial Parkway (US Highway 231) in Huntsville, Alabama
 Garden State Parkway in New Jersey
 Jackie Robinson Parkway in New York City
 A312 road in London, England